The Opium Runners is a 1913 Australian silent film. It is considered a lost film.

It was made by the Gaumont Agency who also made Call of the Bush (1912).

It is possible the movie was based on a collection of short stories called The Opium Runners by FRC Hopkins, who had also written All for Gold.

It was advertised as "A Picture that makes you rise from your seat' with excitement A Story with a Perfect Plot and Exceptional' Acting, 'showing many Pretty Typical Scenes of the Australian Bush."

References

External links
The Opium Runners at IMDb

1913 films
Lost Australian films
Australian silent short films
Australian black-and-white films